Adaikala Matha College is an arts and science college in Vallam, Thanjavur, Tamil Nadu, India.

History 
The Adaikalamatha College (AMC) is the first Self Financing college in Thanjavur district. The college was established in 1988 by A.Arunachalam, the 1st Registrar of Bharathidasan University and former Registrar of Madras Institute of Technology.

Location
The Institution is situated at Vallam, 7 km. from the historical town of Thanjavur.

Facilities
  Computer Lab only
 Conference Hall
 Library
 Hostel
 Mess Facilities
 Canteen(Thendral Unavagam)
 Transportation

Institutions
 Adaikalamatha Institute of Management
 Arun College of Education
 Adaikalamatha Institute of Teacher Training
 Christu Raj College, Trichy.
 Christu Raj Institute of Management
 Fr.Antonys Matriculation Hr.Sec School, Vallam.

Departments
 Tamil
 English
 Mathematics
 Commerce
 Economics
 Physics&Applied Physics
 Electronics
 Computer Science&Applications
 Social Work
 Management Studies

References

External links
 Official website

Education in Thanjavur district
Educational institutions established in 1988
Colleges in Tamil Nadu
1988 establishments in Tamil Nadu